Anxietas perplexa is a species of extremely small deep water sea snail, a marine gastropod mollusk in the family Seguenziidae.

Distribution
This marine species occurs off Christmas Island.

References

External links
 To World Register of Marine Species
 Australian  Faunal Directory: Anxietas perplexa

perplexa
Gastropods described in 1917